Eupithecia verprota is a moth in the family Geometridae. It is endemic to central China (Shaanxi).

The forewings are pale grey and the hindwings are pale whitish grey.

References

External links

Moths described in 2006
Endemic fauna of China
Moths of Asia
verprota